Euphorbia abdelkuri is a species of plant in the family Euphorbiaceae. It is endemic to Abd al Kuri, an island south of Yemen.  Its natural habitat is rocky areas. The Latex of the plant is toxic.

As most other succulent members of the genus Euphorbia, its trade is regulated under Appendix II of CITES.

References 

abdelkuri
Endemic flora of Socotra
Endangered flora of Asia
Taxonomy articles created by Polbot
Taxa named by Isaac Bayley Balfour
abdelkuri